Raccoon Island may refer to:

 Raccoon Island (Massachusetts)
 Raccoon Island (New Jersey)
 Raccoon Island (Ohio)